This is a list of people executed in the United States in 2005. Sixty people were executed in the United States in 2005. Nineteen of them were in the state of Texas. One (Frances Elaine Newton) was female. The states of Connecticut and Maryland carried out their last executions in 2005, with both states having since abolished capital punishment.

List of people executed in the United States in 2005

Demographics

Executions in recent years

See also
 List of death row inmates in the United States
 List of most recent executions by jurisdiction
 List of people scheduled to be executed in the United States
 List of women executed in the United States since 1976

References

List of people executed in the United States
executed
People executed in the United States
2005